Christopher Kyle Ogden (born October 16, 1980) is an American college basketball coach who is the currently an assistant coach at Texas. He was previously the head coach at UT Arlington.

Playing career
Ogden was a four-year player at Texas from 1999 to 2003, playing for Rick Barnes where he was a member of four NCAA tournament teams, and graduated as the school's all-time winningest player, as he was a part of 97 wins.

Coaching career
While completing his undergraduate studies, Ogden assumed a student assistant role, and move into various administrative roles for Texas until 2008, when he was elevated to assistant coach. He remained on staff with Barnes through 2015, and followed Barnes to Tennessee as an assistant coach for the 2015–2016 season. Ogden returned to his home state as an assistant coach under Chris Beard at Texas Tech for two seasons.

On April 6, 2018, Ogden was named the eighth head coach in UT Arlington basketball history, replacing Scott Cross.

Ogden returned to his alma mater in 2021 as an assistant under Beard, who took the Texas job on April 1.

Head coaching record

References

Living people
1980 births
American men's basketball coaches
American men's basketball players
Basketball coaches from Texas
Basketball players from Texas
People from Seminole, Texas
Tennessee Volunteers basketball coaches
Texas Longhorns men's basketball coaches
Texas Longhorns men's basketball players
Texas Tech Red Raiders basketball coaches
UT Arlington Mavericks men's basketball coaches